Addison Apartments is a historic apartment building located at Charlotte, Mecklenburg County, North Carolina.  It was built in 1926, and is a nine-story, steel frame building sheathed in light brick and cast stone.  The Classical Revival style building consists of a two-story base, six-story shaft, and one-story capital with a distinctive stepped pediment.  The front facade features a two-story portico with a deck.

It was listed on the National Register of Historic Places in 1990.

References

Residential buildings on the National Register of Historic Places in North Carolina
Neoclassical architecture in North Carolina
Residential buildings completed in 1926
Buildings and structures in Charlotte, North Carolina
National Register of Historic Places in Mecklenburg County, North Carolina